Karel Krautgartner (July 20, 1922 – September 20, 1982) was a Czech jazz and classical clarinetist, saxophonist, arranger, composer, conductor and teacher.

Life 
He was born in Mikulov, Moravia, in the family of a postmaster. His family were of Moravian German ethnic which have assimilated into Czech people. In 1930 he began to play piano. In 1935, after moving to Brno, he found interest mainly in the radio broadcasting and specially in jazz. He began to study clarinet on private basis with Stanislav Krtička (a notable Czech clarinetist of the first half of 20th century, he performed demanding part of the Concertino by Leoš Janáček at composer's request at the festival of contemporary music in Frankfurt am Main in 1926). Krautgartner acquired necessary skills of clarinet playing, and also inherited "fanatic passion" for clarinet construction and components (reeds, mouthpieces, barrels). He later used his knowledge of wind instruments as a lecturer at German universities in Cologne and Düsseldorf. In 1936, Krautgartner founded the student orchestra Quick band. In 1942, he signed his first professional contract as a saxophonist in the Gustav Brom orchestra in the hotel Passage in Brno. In 1943 he gradually created Dixie Club and started to arrange in the Benny Goodman and Glenn Miller styles. During 1945 - 1955, the core of the Dixie Club moved gradually to Prague and became a part of Karel Vlach orchestra. Krautgartner achieved a privileged position as the leader of saxophone section and started to contribute with his own compositions. In 1956, he founded Karel Krautgartner Quintet, along with Karel Velebný. The group played in various line-ups modern jazz, swing, dixieland and accompanied popular singers. From 1958 to 1960 he performed with the All star band, an orchestra playing in west-coast style, and with Studio 5, (dixieland band, won the 1st place in the category of small orchestras at 7ht Youth Festival in Vienna, 1959). Between 1960 and 1968 he became the head of the Taneční orchestr Československého rozhlasu (Dance Orchestra of Czechoslovakia Radio). In 1967 the orchestra was renamed to Karel Krautgartner Orchestra. In 1968, after the Soviet invasion of Czechoslovakia, he emigrated to Vienna, Austria and became the chief conductor of the 0RF Bigband. Later he moved to Cologne, Germany. He died in 1982 in Germany.

Recordings 

Jazz
Případ ještě nekončí CD. Prague, RADIOSERVIS. FR 0131-2http://www.radioservis-as.cz/katalog/zbozi.php?detail=954
Karel Krautgartner a Jazzový orchestr Čs. rozhlasu CD. Prague, RADIOSERVIS. FR 0132-2
Docela všední, obyčejný den CD. Prague, RADIOSERVIS. FR 0179-2
Jazz kolem Karla Krautgartnera LP. (Supraphon 1965)

Classical
Stravinsky: L' Histoire du Soldat, Octet for Winds, Symphony for Winds, Ebony Concerto... CD. Supraphon SU 3168-2 911, 1999.
Glazunov: Saxophone Concerto. CD. Supraphon Archive SU 3968-2, 2009.

Notes

References 
Karel Krautgartner: Případ ještě nekončí CD (Sleeve note) Praha, RADIOSERVIS. FR 0131-2

External links 
Jazzman's official web page / Karel Krautgartner
cfn.cz
muzikus.cz
reflex.cz

1922 births
1982 deaths
Clarinetists
Czech classical musicians
Czech jazz musicians
Czechoslovak emigrants to Germany
Saxophonists
20th-century classical musicians
20th-century saxophonists